The 2010 Asian Fencing Championships were held in Seoul, South Korea from 8 July to 13 July 2010.

Medal summary

Men

Women

Medal table

References

Results

External links
Official website

Asian Championship
F
Asian Fencing Championships
2010 in South Korea
2010s in Seoul
International fencing competitions hosted by South Korea
July 2010 sports events in South Korea